Ray or Raymond Austin may refer to:
 W. Ray Austin (1888–1962), American pharmacist and member of the New York State Assembly
 Raymond Austin (baseball) (fl. 1930–1932), Negro league baseball player
 Ray Austin (director) (born 1932), British television director and stuntman
 Ray Austin (boxer) (born 1970), American professional boxer
 Ray Austin (American football) (born 1974), American football player